Christina Lathan (née Brehmer; born 28 February 1958) is a retired East German sprinter, who specialised in the 400 metres.

Born in Altdöbern, Brehmer started training in 1969 at the sports club SG Dynamo Senftenberg, and was transferred to SC Dynamo Berlin in 1973. At the 1975 European Junior Championships she won three gold medals, in 400 m, 4 × 100 metres relay and 4 × 400 metres relay.

In 1976 she set world record 49.77 seconds, first electronic time under 50 seconds. The record was broken by Poland's Irena Szewińska a month later. At the 1976 Summer Olympics in Montreal she won the silver medal in the 400 m behind Irena Szewinska, as well as a gold medal in the 4 x 400 m relay with her teammates Brigitte Rohde, 400 m bronze medalist Ellen Streidt and Doris Maletzki.

The next year Lathan won another relay gold medal at the IAAF World Cup 1977. At the 1978 European Championships she won a silver medal in the individual event and another gold medal in 4 x 400 m relay, together with teammates Christiane Marquardt, Barbara Krug and Marita Koch. She then duplicated her World Cup success at the 1979 IAAF World Cup.

She returned to the 1980 Summer Olympics and won a bronze medal in the 400 m behind Marita Koch and Jarmila Kratochvílová. In the 4 x 400 m relay she was the sole survivor of the 1976 winning team and could only win the silver medal with her teammates Gabriele Löwe, Barbara Krug and Marita Koch.

References 

1958 births
Living people
People from Altdöbern
People from Bezirk Cottbus
East German female sprinters
Sportspeople from Brandenburg
Olympic athletes of East Germany
Athletes (track and field) at the 1976 Summer Olympics
Athletes (track and field) at the 1980 Summer Olympics
Olympic gold medalists for East Germany
Olympic silver medalists for East Germany
Olympic bronze medalists for East Germany
European Athletics Championships medalists
Medalists at the 1980 Summer Olympics
Medalists at the 1976 Summer Olympics
Olympic gold medalists in athletics (track and field)
Olympic silver medalists in athletics (track and field)
Olympic bronze medalists in athletics (track and field)
Universiade medalists in athletics (track and field)
Recipients of the Patriotic Order of Merit in silver
Universiade bronze medalists for East Germany
Medalists at the 1979 Summer Universiade
Olympic female sprinters